Hanoi University of Industry (Abbreviated as HaUI; , "Hanoi University of Industry (HaUI)"), founded 1898, is one of the first technical school in Vietnam.

History
Hanoi Vocational School was established on 10 August 1898, in accordance with the decision of Hanoi Chamber of Commerce. It was renamed Hanoi Practical Technology School in 1931. Hai Phong Vocational School was established on 29 August 1913, in accordance with the degree by the Governor – General of Indochina. In 1921, it was renamed Hai Phong Practical Technology School.

The first course of the Technical High School No. 1 began on 15 February 1955, at the place of the former Hanoi Practical Technology School (2F Quang Trung). In 1956, the first course of Technical Worker Training School No.1 began at the place of the former Hai Phong Practical Technology School (May To street, Hai Phong). During the war, the school moved to Bac Giang province.

In 1962, Technical High School No.1 recruited college level students. It was renamed as Electrical Engineering Senior School. It was renamed Mechanical High School No.1 in 1966. In 1993 it was renamed to the former name of as Hanoi Practical Technology School. During the war, the school moved to Vinh Phuc province.

In 1986, Technical Worker Training School No.1 moved to Minh Khai commune of Tu Liem district, Hanoi.
In 1991, Hanoi Practical Technology School moved to Tay Tuu village, Tu Liem district, Hanoi.
On 22 April 1997, the Ministry of Industry issued the decision 580/QD-TCCB to merge the two schools: Technical Worker Training School No.1 and Hanoi Practical Technology School. The new school was named Industrial High School No.1. On 28 May 1999, Industrial High School No.1 was upgraded to Hanoi Industrial College by the Decision 126/QD-TTG by the Prime Minister.

On 2 December 2005, the Prime Minister signed the Decision 315/2005 QD-TTG to established Hanoi University of Industry on the basis of Hanoi Industrial College.

Academics

Departments

 Faculty of Mechanical Engineering
 Faculty of Automobile Technology
 Faculty of Electrical Engineering Technology
 Faculty of Electronics Engineering Technology
 Faculty of Information Technology
 Faculty of Auditing and Accounting
 Faculty of Business Management
 Faculty of Chemical Technology
 Faculty of Garment Technology and Fashion Design
 Faculty of Foreign languages
 Faculty of Technical Teacher's Training and Tourism
 Faculty of International Cooperation and Training
 Faculty of Physical-National Defense Education
 Faculty of Fundamental Science
 Faculty of Tourism - Padogogy
 Faculty of In-service Training

Training center
 Graduate Education Center
 Center for Research & Delopment and Technology Transfer
 Center for Driver Training
 HaUI Honhai Centre for Technical Training
 Center for Informatics and Foreign Language
 Vietnam-Korea Mechanical Engineering Center
 Vietnam-Japan Centre
 In-Service Center

Services center
 Center for Enterprise Partnership and Vocational Skill Assessment
 Library center
 Quality Management center
 Domitory - Canteen - Services Center
 Health Care Service Center

References

External links 
 

Universities in Hanoi
Technical universities and colleges in Vietnam